Nduumo (Mindumbu) is a Bantu language spoken in Gabon.

References

Mbete languages